Stade Jean Laville is a multi-use stadium in Gueugnon, France.  It is currently used mostly for football matches and is the home stadium of FC Gueugnon. The stadium is able to hold 13,872 people.  

It host two France Six Nations Under 20s Championship home matches. The first was against Scotland on February 7, 2015 with France winning 47 - 6. The other was against Italy on February 23, 2018 with France winning 78 - 12.

References

Jean Laville
FC Gueugnon
Sports venues in Saône-et-Loire
Sports venues completed in 1919